The seventh season of the American animated television series SpongeBob SquarePants, created by marine biologist and animator Stephen Hillenburg, originally aired on Nickelodeon in the United States from July 19, 2009, to June 11, 2011. It contained 26 half-hour episodes, with a miniseries titled Legends of Bikini Bottom. The series chronicles the exploits and adventures of the title character and his various friends in the fictional underwater city of Bikini Bottom.

The season was executive produced by series creator Hillenburg and writer Paul Tibbitt, who also acted as the showrunner. In 2011, Legends of Bikini Bottom, an anthology series consisting of episodes from the season, was launched. A number of guest stars appeared on the season's episodes. Several compilation DVDs that contained episodes from the season were released. The SpongeBob SquarePants: Complete Seventh Season DVD was released in Region 1 on December 6, 2011, Region 2 on September 17, 2012, and Region 4 on September 12, 2012.

The series won the 2010 Kids' Choice Awards in the category of Favorite Cartoon. The episode "That Sinking Feeling" was nominated at the 63rd Primetime Emmy Awards for Outstanding Short-format Animated Program. Furthermore, at the 38th Annie Awards, the show won for Best Animated Television Production for Children.

Production
The season aired on Nickelodeon, which is owned by Viacom, and was produced by United Plankton Pictures and Nickelodeon Animation Studio. The season's executive producers were series creator Stephen Hillenburg and Paul Tibbitt, who also acted as the series' showrunner. On March 13, 2008, during the broadcast of the sixth season, the network renewed the show for a seventh season, with 26 episodes in order. Cyma Zarghami, president of Nickelodeon & MTVN Kids and Family Group, said, "The strength of the Nickelodeon brand comes from how we embrace everything important to kids, and how we are with them virtually everywhere they want us to be. Our open philosophy to give audiences access to everything they love, and our commitment to making relevant and innovative content, have put us at the top of cable, VOD and online. Nickelodeon has strong momentum as a brand and as a business, and we have a great foundation built on great talent and relationships with some of the best creative leaders in our industry."

In a statement, Brown Johnson, president of animation for Nickelodeon, said, "We are thrilled to be making another season of SpongeBob SquarePants–a series we hope to make for a long time." On July 19, 2009, the season premiered with "Tentacle-Vision" and "I Heart Dancing". The former was written by Luke Brookshier, Nate Cash and Derek Iversen, with Alan Smart serving as animation director. "I Heart Dancing" was written by Casey Alexander, Zeus Cervas, Mr. Lawrence, and was directed by Tom Yasumi. "Growth Spout", "Stuck in the Wringer", "Someone's in the Kitchen with Sandy", and "The Inside Job" also premiered on the same day as part of the Ultimate SpongeBob Sponge Bash marathon, that celebrate the series' tenth anniversary including the premiere of ten brand new episodes.

In 2011, Nickelodeon debuted an anthology series, Legends of Bikini Bottom, of six seventh-season episodes in the show. It was released on January 27, 2011, on the online social networking service Facebook before it aired on the cable channel Nickelodeon. "Trenchbillies" was the first episode to air on Facebook and was written by Aaron Springer and Richard Pursel, with Andrew Overtoom serving as animation director. Nickelodeon said on January 27 that SpongeBob SquarePants has more than 16 million "friends" on Facebook. The decision of airing the series online was aimed at attracting "the young and the restless hooked to the internet and the social media." In a press release, Brown Johnson said, "The anthology format of Legends of Bikini Bottom provides a great opportunity to try something new where we can give SpongeBobs 16 million fans on Facebook a first look, in addition to new content on-air". Each episode was available for two weeks on Facebook. The other four called "Sponge-Cano!", "The Main Drain", "The Monster Who Came to Bikini Bottom" and "Welcome to the Bikini Bottom Triangle" premiered on Nickelodeon in an hour-long special on January 28, 2011.

Animation was handled overseas in South Korea at Rough Draft Studios. Animation directors credited with episodes in the seventh season included Andrew Overtoom, Alan Smart, and Tom Yasumi. Episodes were written by a team of writers, which consisted of Casey Alexander, Steven Banks, Luke Brookshier, Nate Cash, Zeus Cervas, Sean Charmatz, Derek Ivesen, Mr. Lawrence, Dani Michaeli, Richard Pursel, and Aaron Springer. The season was storyboarded by Alexander, Brookshier, Cash, Cervas, Charmatz, and Springer.

Cast

The seventh season featured Tom Kenny as the voice of the title character SpongeBob SquarePants and his pet snail Gary. SpongeBob's best friend, a starfish named Patrick Star, was voiced by Bill Fagerbakke, while Rodger Bumpass played the voice of Squidward Tentacles, an arrogant and ill-tempered octopus. Other members of the cast were Clancy Brown as Mr. Krabs, a miserly crab obsessed with money who is SpongeBob's boss at the Krusty Krab; Mr. Lawrence as Plankton, a small green copepod and Mr. Krabs' business rival; Jill Talley as Karen, Plankton's sentient computer sidekick; Carolyn Lawrence as Sandy Cheeks, a squirrel from Texas; Mary Jo Catlett as Mrs. Puff, SpongeBob's boating school teacher; and Lori Alan as Pearl, a teenage whale who is Mr. Krabs' daughter.

In addition to the regular cast members, episodes feature guest voices from many ranges of professions, including actors, musicians, and artists. For instance, in the episode "Back to the Past", Ernest Borgnine and Tim Conway returned, reprising their respective roles as Mermaid Man and Barnacle Boy. The episode is also guest starred by the original Batman series stars Adam West as the young Mermaid Man and Burt Ward as the young Barnacle Boy. Borgnie and Conway later voiced their recurring roles in the episode "The Bad Guy Club for Villains". Brian Doyle-Murray also reprised his role as the Flying Dutchman for "The Curse of Bikini Bottom". Comedian and actress Laraine Newman voices the character of Plankton's grandma in "Gramma's Secret Recipe". In the anthology series Legends of Bikini Bottom, actresses Amy Sedaris and Ginnifer Goodwin guest star. Sedaris appears in the episode "Trenchbillies" as the voice of Ma Angler. Goodwin also guest stars as the voice of a purple-haired mermaid in the episode "Welcome to the Bikini Bottom Triangle". She lends her voice to a teenage mermaid who steals from others through Bikini Bottom's version of the Bermuda Triangle. In "The Curse of Hex", Saturday Night Lives Kristen Wiig guest stars as the voice of Madame Hagfish. Marion Ross voiced her recurring role as Grandma SquarePants, SpongeBob's grandmother, in "The Abrasive Side".

Reception
The series has received recognition, including the 2010 Kids' Choice Awards for Favorite Cartoon. The series also won the same category at the succeeding year's Kids' Choice Awards and at the 2010 and 2011 Indonesia Kids' Choice Awards. At the Kids' Choice Awards Mexico 2010 and Kids' Choice Awards Argentina 2011, the show was nominated for Favorite Cartoon, but did not win. The episode "That Sinking Feeling" was nominated at the 63rd Primetime Emmy Awards for Outstanding Short-format Animated Program. Furthermore, at the 38th Annie Awards, the show won for Best Animated Television Production for Children, while the crew members, Jeremy Wakefield, Sage Guyton, Nick Carr and Tuck Tucker, won the Music in a Television Production category. SpongeBob SquarePants also won at the 2011 ASCAP Film and Television Awards for Top Television Series. At the 2010 and 2011 TP de Oro, the series won the Best Children and Youth Program category.

The season received mixed to negative reviews, with certain episodes being panned by critics and audiences alike. In his review of the seventh season for DVD Talk, Ian Jane wrote that the series "is one of those rare animated shows that can be enjoyed equally as much by both adults and children." He described the concept of the show as "utterly ludicrous." He cited the episodes "SpongeBob's Last Stand" and "Tentacle-Vision" as "interesting stand outs," while the episodes "The Inside Job", "Back to the Past", "Gary in Love", and "The Abrasive Side" as "memorable episodes this time around." However, Jane said that the season is not as good as the previous seasons, writing "It's not that this more recent material isn't fun, because it is, but by this point in time storylines are beginning to get a little repetitive and as such, the series doesn't seem quite as fresh and original as it once did." Jane "recommended" the DVD set, writing "This latest collection of episodes is not a high point in the series but it's still decent enough family friendly entertainment, even if it does get too repetitive for its own good."

Josh Rode of DVD Verdict said that the season "has its moments", but is "by far the least consistently funny season of the venerable cartoon." Rode also said that the characters of SpongeBob SquarePants and Patrick Star "have become the least engaging parts of the show, which is a problem since they dominate screen time." He perceived that Patrick "has been dumbed down too far." As for the character of SpongeBob, he criticized his changing voice that has become "more nasal over the years." He described the character "like a happy, fun-loving, not-overly-intelligent sponge," but said that "[He] has entirely lost the naïveté which has long been the basis of his charm."

Episodes

The episodes are ordered below according to Nickelodeon's packaging order, and not their original production or broadcast order.

DVD release
The DVD boxset for season seven was released by Paramount Home Entertainment in the United States and Canada in December 2011, six months after the season had completed broadcast on television. The DVD release features bonus materials, including "animated shorts."

Notes

References

External links
  at IMDb
 Season 7 at Metacritic

2009 American television seasons
2010 American television seasons
2011 American television seasons
SpongeBob SquarePants seasons